Patrick Galbraith and Danie Visser were the defending champions, but competed this year with different partners. Galbraith teamed up with Grant Connell and lost in the semifinals to Jim Courier and Mark Knowles, while Visser teamed up with Laurie Warder and lost in the second round, also to Courier and Knowles.

Jim Courier and Mark Knowles won the title by defeating Glenn Michibata and David Pate 6–4, 7–6 in the final.

Seeds
The first four seeds received a bye into the second round.

Draw

Finals

Top half

Bottom half

References

External links
 Official results archive (ATP)
 Official results archive (ITF)

1993 ATP Tour